The 2016 North Dakota State Bison football team represented North Dakota State University in the 2016 NCAA Division I FCS football season. They were led by third-year head coach Chris Klieman. The team played their 24th season in the Fargodome, entering the season as the five-time defending national champions and five-time Missouri Valley Football Conference Champions. The Bison have been members of the Missouri Valley Football Conference since the 2008 season.

They were one of very few FCS teams who ever beat a highly ranked FBS team (in this case, No. 13 Iowa).  After that win, for four weeks they received votes in the AP's poll of the best football teams in the country (including FBS teams).  Their 74 votes in week 3 (barely missing out on a Top 25 ranking) were the most votes ever earned by an FCS program in the AP Poll.

The Bison went 12–2 on the season and won their sixth straight conference title with their lone loss coming on a last-second touchdown versus rival SDSU. The Bison received an at-large bid to the FCS Playoffs where they defeated San Diego and South Dakota State in the second round and quarterfinals before losing to James Madison in the semifinals, ending their five-year championship run.

Schedule

 Source: STATS Poll 
 ** Second-most watched FCS Game of all time – 1.98m viewers on ESPN

Roster

Recruiting class

Coaching staff

Game summaries
Polls are based on the FCS STATS Poll

Charleston Southern

   (Q2, 9:44) CSU – Jacob Smoak 46 yard field goal – CSU 3–0
   (Q2, 0:00) NDSU – #36 Cam Pedersen 52 yard field goal – TIED 3–3
   (Q3, 13:07) CSU – Mike Holloway 47 yard run (Tyler Tekac kick) – CSU 10–3
   (Q3, 10:02) NDSU – #20 Darrius Shepherd 23 yard pass from #12 Easton Stick (#36 Cam Pedersen kick) – TIED 10–10
   (Q4, 10:34) NDSU – #16 RJ Urzendowski 47 yard pass from #12 Easton Stick (#36 Cam Pedersen kick) – NDSU 17–10
   (Q4, 2:59) CSU – Mike Holloway 6 yard run (Tyler Tekac kick) – TIED 17–17
   (OT) NDSU – #22 King Frazier 25 yard run (#36 Cam Pedersen kick) – NDSU 24–17

Eastern Washington

   (Q1, 6:19) NDSU – #22 King Frazier 8 yard run (#36 Cam Pedersen kick) – NDSU 7–0
   (Q2, 12:54) EWU – Cooper Kupp 20 yard pass from Gage Gubrud (Roldan Alcobendas kick) – TIED 7–7
   (Q2, 11:01) NDSU – #12 Easton Stick 1 yard run (#36 Cam Pedersen kick) – NDSU 14–7
   (Q2, 6:12) NDSU – #86 Jeff Illies 33 yard pass from #12 Easton Stick (#36 Cam Pedersen kick) – NDSU 21–7
   (Q2, 5:05) EWU – Cooper Kupp 8 yard pass from Gage Gubrud (Roldan Alcobendas kick) – NDSU 21–14
   (Q3, 10:58) EWU – Roldan Alcobendas 37 yard field goal – NDSU 21–17
   (Q3, 7:05) NDSU – #20 Darrius Shepherd 37 yard pass from #12 Easton Stick (#36 Cam Pedersen kick) – NDSU 28–17
   (Q3, 4:06) EWU – Gage Gubrud 13 yard run (Roldan Alcobendas kick) – NDSU 28–24
   (Q4, 14:53) NDSU – #10 Lance Dunn 41 yard run (#36 Cam Pedersen kick) – NDSU 35–24
   (Q4, 12:05) EWU – Nsimba Webster 35 yard pass from Gage Gubrud (Roldan Alcobendas kick) – NDSU 35–31
   (Q4, 9:29) NDSU – #49 Nick DeLuca 40 yard interception return – NDSU 41–31
   (Q4, 7:49) EWU – Stu Stiles 34 yard pass from Gage Gubrud – NDSU 41–37
   (Q3, 4:32) EWU – Tamarick Pierce 1 yard run (Roldan Alcobendas kick) – EWU 44–41
   (Q4, 0:42) NDSU – #36 Cam Pedersen 28 yard field goal – TIED 44–44
   (OT) NDSU – #10 Lance Dunn 25 yard run (#36 Cam Pedersen kick) – NDSU 50–44

at Iowa

   (Q1, 2:26) NDSU – #41 MJ Stumpf 21 yard interception return (#36 Cam Pedersen kick) – NDSU 7–0
   (Q2, 13:03) IOWA – Riley McCarron 30 yard pass from C. J. Beathard (Keith Duncan kick) – TIED 7–7
   (Q2, 8:05) IOWA – Matt VandeBerg 14 yard pass from C.J. Beathard (Keith Duncan kick) – IOWA 14–7
   (Q3, 8:06) NDSU – #22 King Frazier 1 yard run (#36 Cam Pedersen kick) – TIED 14–14
   (Q3, 2:12) IOWA – Matt VandeBerg 9 yard pass from C.J. Beathard (Keith Duncan kick) – IOWA 21–14
   (Q4, 3:41) NDSU – #25 Chase Morlock 7 yard pass from #12 Easton Stick – IOWA 21–20
   (Q4, 0:00) NDSU – #36 Cam Pedersen 37 yard field goal – NDSU 23–21

Illinois State

   (Q1, 8:12) ILST – Sean Slattery 23 yard field goal – ILST 3–0
   (Q1, 1:14) NDSU – #20 Darrius Shepherd 31 yard run (#36 Cam Pedersen kick) – NDSU 7–3
   (Q2, 13:06) ILST – Anthony Fowler 18 yard pass from Jake Kolbe (Sean Slattery kick) – ILST 10–7
   (Q2, 12:48) NDSU – #16 RJ Urzendowski 65 yard pass from #12 Easton Stick (#36 Cam Pedersen kick) – NDSU 14–10
   (Q2, 8:43) NDSU – #10 Lance Dunn 38 yard pass from #12 Easton Stick (#36 Cam Pedersen kick) – NDSU 21–10
   (Q2, 0:27) NDSU – #85 Nate Jenson 35 yard pass from #12 Easton Stick (#36 Cam Pedersen kick) – NDSU 28–10
   (Q3, 0:39) NDSU – #36 Cam Pedersen 47 yard field goal – NDSU 31–10

at Missouri State

   (Q1, 9:43) MOST – Zach Drake 50 yard field goal – MOST 3–0
   (Q2, 8:14) NDSU – #36 Cam Pedersen 38 yard field goal – TIED 3–3
   (Q2, 5:45) NDSU – #20 Darrius Shepherd 21 yard pass from #12 Easton Stick (#36 Cam Pedersen kick) – NDSU 10–3
   (Q2, 0:27) NDSU – #36 Cam Pedersen 21 yard field goal – NDSU 13–3
   (Q4, 13:08) NDSU – #22 King Frazier 22 yard run (#36 Cam Pedersen kick) – NDSU 20–3
   (Q4, 4:51) NDSU – #22 King Frazier 4 yard run (#36 Cam Pedersen kick) – NDSU 27–3

South Dakota State

   (Q2, 13:49) NDSU – #12 Easton Stick 1 yard run (#36 Cam Pedersen kick) – NDSU 7–0
   (Q2, 2:13) SDSU – Chase Vinatieri 38 yard field goal – NDSU 7–3
   (Q2, 0:00) NDSU – #36 Cam Pedersen 49 yard field goal – NDSU 10–3
   (Q3, 10:16) NDSU – #12 Easton Stick 26 yard run (#36 Cam Pedersen kick) – NDSU 17–3
   (Q3, 5:26) SDSU – Dallas Goedert 12 yard pass from Taryn Christion (Chase Vinatieri kick) – NDSU 17–10
   (Q4, 11:04) SDSU – Chase Vinatieri 42 yard field goal – NDSU 17–13
   (Q4, 0:01) SDSU – Jake Wieneke 2 yard pass from Taryn Christion – SDSU 19–17

at Western Illinois

   (Q1, 10:00) NDSU – #22 King Frazier 3 yard run (#36 Cam Pedersen kick) – NDSU 7–0
   (Q1, 0:19) WIU – Nathan Knuffman 29 yard field goal – NDSU 7–3
   (Q2, 11:16) WIU – Nathan Knuffman 28 yard field goal – NDSU 7–6
   (Q2, 3:25) NDSU – #22 King Frazier 1 yard run (#36 Cam Pedersen kick) – NDSU 14–6
   (Q2, 0:45) NDSU – #86 Jeff Illies 17 yard pass from #12 Easton Stick (#36 Cam Pedersen kick) – NDSU 21–6
   (Q3, 8:56) WIU – Jamie Gilmore 3 yard run (Nathan Knuffman kick) – NDSU 21–13

at Northern Iowa

   (Q1, 4:42) NDSU – #22 King Frazier 1 yard run (#36 Cam Pedersen kick) – NDSU 7–0
   (Q2, 13:12) UNI – Austin Errthum 30 yard field goal – NDSU 7–3
   (Q2, 1:22) NDSU – #86 Jeff Illies 31 yard pass from #12 Easton Stick (#36 Cam Pedersen kick) – NDSU 14–3
   (Q2, 0:00) UNI – Austin Errthum 25 yard field goal – NDSU 14–6
   (Q3, 7:19) NDSU – #25 Chase Morlock 8 yard run (#36 Cam Pedersen kick) – NDSU 21–6
   (Q3, 2:52) UNI – Jaylin James 17 yard pass from Eli Dunne (Austin Errthum kick) – NDSU 21–13
   (Q4, 14:53) NDSU – #36 Cam Pedersen 25 yard field goal – NDSU 24–13
   (Q4, 12:10) UNI – Briley Moore 4 yard pass from Eli Dunne (Austin Errthum kick) – NDSU 24–20

Youngstown State

   (Q1, 7:34) NDSU – #25 Chase Morlock 71 yard run (#36 Cam Pedersen kick) – NDSU 7–0
   (Q1, 3:54) NDSU – #36 Cam Pedersen 36 yard field goal – NDSU 10–0
   (Q1, 1:51) NDSU – #86 Jeff Illies 15 yard pass from #12 Easton Stick (#36 Cam Pedersen kick) – NDSU 17–0
   (Q2, 8:28) YSU – Zak Kennedy 32 yard field goal – NDSU 17–3
   (Q4, 12:39) NDSU – #10 Lance Dunn 7 yard run (#36 Cam Pedersen kick) – NDSU 24–3

Indiana State

   (Q1, 12:03) NDSU – #20 Darrius Shepherd 84 yard punt return (#36 Cam Pedersen kick) – NDSU 7–0
   (Q1, 6:42) NDSU – #12 Easton Stick 16 yard run (#36 Cam Pedersen kick) – NDSU 14–0
   (Q1, 2:04) NDSU – #12 Easton Stick 42 yard run (#36 Cam Pedersen kick) – NDSU 21–0
   (Q2, 8:23) NDSU – #36 Cam Pedersen 29 yard field goal – NDSU 24–0
   (Q2, 5:09) NDSU – #22 King Frazier 2 yard run (#36 Cam Pedersen kick) – NDSU 31–0
   (Q2, 1:47)  ISU – Kelvin Cook 2 yard run (Jerry Nunez kick) – NDSU 31–7
   (Q2, 0:00) NDSU – #36 Cam Pedersen 45 yard field goal – NDSU 34–7
   (Q3, 11:07) NDSU – #10 Lance Dunn 14 yard run (#36 Cam Pedersen kick) – NDSU 41–7
   (Q4, 12:43)  ISU – Jerry Nunez 41 yard field goal – NDSU 41–10
   (Q4, 4:52)  ISU – Roland Genesy 2 yard run (Jerry Nunez kick) – NDSU 41–17

at South Dakota

   (Q1, 7:29) NDSU – #22 King Frazier 1 yard run (#36 Cam Pedersen kick) – NDSU 7–0
   (Q1, 3:58) SD – Tacari Carpenter 36 yard pass from Chris Streveler (Miles Bergner kick) – TIED 7–7
   (Q2, 8:42) NDSU – #20 Darrius Shepherd 40 yard pass from #12 Easton Stick (#36 Cam Pedersen kick) – NDSU 14–7
   (Q2, 4:01) SD – Chris Streveler 1 yard run (Miles Bergner kick) – TIED 14–14
   (Q2, 1:01) NDSU – #86 Jeff Illies 13 yard pass from #12 Easton Stick (#36 Cam Pedersen kick) – NDSU 21–14
   (Q3, 11:30) NDSU – #87 Connor Wentz 6 yard pass from #12 Easton Stick (#36 Cam Pedersen kick) – NDSU 28–14
   (Q4, 9:30) SD – Alonge Brooks 12 yard pass from Chris Streveler (Miles Bergner kick) – NDSU 28–21

FCS Playoffs

Second Round–San Diego

   (Q1, 10:49) NDSU – #41 MJ Stumpf 40 yard interception return (#36 Cam Pedersen kick) – NDSU 7–0
   (Q2, 7:11) NDSU – #25 Chase Morlock 16 yard pass from #12 Easton Stick (#36 Cam Pedersen kick) – NDSU 14–0
   (Q2, 0:39) NDSU – #16 RJ Urzendowski 11 yard pass from #12 Easton Stick (#36 Cam Pedersen kick) – NDSU 21–0
   (Q3, 6:56) USD – Ross Dwelley 1 yard pass from Anthony Lawrence (Patrick Murray kick) – NDSU 21–7
   (Q3, 4:48) NDSU – #25 Chase Morlock 49 yard pass from #12 Easton Stick (#36 Cam Pedersen kick) – NDSU 28–7
   (Q4, 10:13) NDSU – #36 Cam Pedersen 31 yard field goal – NDSU 31–7
   (Q4, 11:30) NDSU – #10 Lance Dunn 56 yard run (#36 Cam Pedersen kick) – NDSU 38–7
   (Q4, 9:30) NDSU – #8 Bruce Anderson 61 yard run (#36 Cam Pedersen kick) – NDSU 45–7

Quarterfinals–South Dakota State

   (Q1, 11:16) SDSU – Brady Mengarelli 5 yard run (Chase Vinatieri kick) – SDSU 7–0
   (Q1, 4:33) SDSU – Chase Vinatieri 34 yard field goal – SDSU 10–0
   (Q1, 1:29) NDSU – #10 Lance Dunn 49 yard run (#36 Cam Pedersen kick) – SDSU 10–7
   (Q2, 1:48) NDSU – #12 Easton Stick 3 yard run (#36 Cam Pedersen kick) – NDSU 14–10
   (Q3, 9:13) NDSU – #90 Grant Morgan Safety – NDSU 16–10
   (Q3, 5:27) NDSU – #36 Cam Pedersen 35 yard field goal – NDSU 19–10
   (Q3, 1:29) NDSU – #36 Cam Pedersen 45 yard field goal – NDSU 22–10
   (Q4, 9:57) NDSU – #12 Easton Stick 14 yard run (#36 Cam Pedersen kick) – NDSU 29–10
   (Q4, 7:14) NDSU – #20 Darrius Shepherd 67 yard pass from #12 Easton Stick (#36 Cam Pedersen kick) – NDSU 36–10

Semifinals–James Madison

   (Q1, 1:18) JMU – Jonathan Kloosterman 14 yard pass from Bryan Schor (Tyler Gray kick) – JMU 7–0
   (Q2, 11:59) JMU – Tyler Gray 23 yard field goal – JMU 10–0
   (Q2, 6:51) JMU – Khalid Abdullah 10 yard pass from Bryan Schor (Tyler Gray kick) – JMU 17–0
   (Q2, 1:36) NDSU – #25 Chase Morlock 3 yard run (#36 Cam Pedersen kick) – JMU 17–7
   (Q3, 11:24) NDSU – #36 Cam Pedersen 45 yard field goal – JMU 17–10
   (Q3, 5:53) NDSU – #22 King Frazier 16 yard run (#36 Cam Pedersen kick) – TIED 17–17
   (Q4, 11:46) JMU – Tyler Gray 45 yard field goal – JMU 20–17
   (Q4, 6:59) JMU – John Miller 25 yard pass from Bryan Schor (Tyler Gray kick) – JMU 27–17

Ranking movements

References

North Dakota State
North Dakota State Bison football seasons
Missouri Valley Football Conference champion seasons
North Dakota State
North Dakota State Bison football